Frigyes Helmeczi (19 December 1913 – April 1984) was a Hungarian ice hockey player. He played for the Hungarian national team at the 1936 Winter Olympics and several World Championships.

References

External links

1913 births
1984 deaths
Hungarian ice hockey forwards
Ice hockey players at the 1936 Winter Olympics
Olympic ice hockey players of Hungary
Ice hockey people from Budapest
20th-century Hungarian people